The Gateshead by-election was a Parliamentary by-election held on 20 January 1904. The constituency returned one Member of Parliament (MP) to the House of Commons of the United Kingdom, elected by the first past the post voting system.

Vacancy
Sir William Allan had been Liberal MP for the seat of Gateshead since the 1893 Gateshead by-election. He died on the 28 December 1903 at the age of 66.

Electoral history
Gateshead had returned Liberal candidates at every election since the seat was created in 1832. Since 1886 their only challengers had been Liberal Unionists. Allan's third and final election win in 1900 was his widest;

Candidates

The local Liberal Association selected 54 year-old John Johnson as their candidate to hold the seat. He was Financial Secretary of the Durham Miners' Association and a member of the Independent Labour Party. Educated at a local village school, he had worked as a miner for 30 years. He had also been elected to Durham County Council. His candidacy was a recognition that a predominantly mining constituency should have a miners candidate.

The local Liberal Unionist Association selected 37 year-old Charles Howard as their candidate. He was the eldest son of the Earl of Carlisle. He was educated at Rugby and Balliol College, Oxford. He joined the British Army, achieved the rank of Captain in the 3rd Border Regiment and served in the Second Boer War. He had contested Chester-le-Street in 1895 and Hexham in 1900.

Campaign
Polling Day was fixed for 20 January 1904, just 23 days after the death of Allen. The campaign was therefore very short.

Result
Despite the fact that this was a January by-election, the voter turn out was well up on the previous election. The Liberals held the seat, slightly increasing their vote share:

Aftermath
In 1904 Morpeth was elected to the House of Commons for Birmingham South, a seat he held until 1911, when he succeeded his father in the earldom and entered the House of Lords. Johnson was re-elected at the 1906 general election:

Johnson's majority had increased in line with the swing to the Liberals across the country. He continued to take the Liberal whip in the Commons until 1909 when he switched to the Labour Party group.

References

1904 in England
1904 elections in the United Kingdom
20th century in County Durham
Gateshead 1904
Gateshead 1904
January 1904 events
Politics of Gateshead